The Landstede Sportcentrum is an indoor sports complex located in Zwolle, Netherlands, which is used as a sports arena and was opened in 2010. It is the home of basketball team Landstede Hammers.  The "centre court", which is used by both the club has a capacity of 1,200 people.

The complex is owned by ROC Landstede, a company that is also main sponsor of the basketball and volleyball clubs. The Sportcentrum is also used for many other sports, like artistic gymnastics and table tennis. In 2011 and 2012, the international basketball tournament Basketball Days was held in the Sportcentrum.

It is nicknamed the Theater van de Sport (Theatre of Sport).

Events
Basketball
2015 Landstede Brose Tournament
Basketball Days

References

Indoor arenas in the Netherlands
Basketball venues in the Netherlands
Volleyball venues in the Netherlands
Buildings and structures in Zwolle
Sport in Zwolle
Sports venues completed in 2010
2010 establishments in the Netherlands
21st-century architecture in the Netherlands